Flagg Township is located in Ogle County, Illinois. As of the 2010 census, its population was 13,562 and it contained 5,525 housing units.

Flagg Township was named for Richard P. Flagg, a pioneer settler.

Geography

Demographics

References

External links
City-data.com
Midwest Government Info
Illinois State Archives

Townships in Ogle County, Illinois
Populated places established in 1849
Townships in Illinois
1849 establishments in Illinois